"Blow Your Mind" is the third overall single to be released from British funk/acid jazz band Jamiroquai's debut studio album, Emergency on Planet Earth (1993). It was released on 24 May 1993 through Sony Soho Square in the United Kingdom, peaking at number 12 on the UK Singles Chart. The song's accompanying music video was directed by Vaughan Arnell and Anthea Benton.

Background
The single was later featured on the group's greatest hits compilation, High Times: Singles 1992–2006; however, its release was a shorter version rather than the original album-length track. Like both of the group's previous singles, two versions of the song exist: a heavily edited radio edit, running at 3:51, and the full-length album version, running at 8:35. The latter version has only ever been officially included on the group's debut album release (as well as the 2013 remaster). All other releases which include the track include the radio edit. The B-side of the single is an instrumental version of the popular Emergency on Planet Earth track "Hooked Up".

Critical reception
In his weekly UK chart commentary, James Masterton wrote, "In many ways this new single is not quite as good a song [as "Too Young to Die"] – this star still has a little way to rise." Steve Morton from Music & Media said, "Again, not unreminiscent of Mr Stevie Wonder and he does it so well. Light piano tinkles, funky guitar flutters, horns ride the controlled storm and that voice breathes each soulful note out effortlessly. Less obviously catchy than "Too Young to Die" but it just oozes summer all over you." Another editor stated, "On a hopping funky bass line Jay is scatting his vocals, while the horn section exhales full blast. Mind blowingly good stuff!" 

Andy Beevers from Music Week gave the song four out of five and named it Pick of the Week in the category of Dance, adding, "The kid can do no wrong at the moment. His third single is a breezy jazz funk track that lacks the lyrical message of its predecessors but is already turning out to be a winner on the nation's dancefloors. Its chart success is assured." Kevin L. Carter from Philadelphia Inquirer felt the "extended electric-piano showcase" "Blow Your Mind" recalls early Herbie Hancock. James Hamilton from the RM Dance Update declared it as "excellent" and "brassy".

Music video
A black-and-white music video was produced to promote the single. It was directed by British music video directors Vaughan Arnell and Anthea Benton, and shows a group of people dancing in a 1970s club, where Jamiroquai are performing the song to the paying crowd. It was later published on the band's official YouTube channel in November 2009 and had generated more than 12.5 million views as of September 2021.

Track listings

 UK CD single (659297 2)
 "Blow Your Mind" (Radio Edit) – 3:51
 "Blow Your Mind" (Album Version) – 8:35
 "Hooked Up" (Instrumental) – 4:36
 "When You Gonna Learn" (JK Mix) – 6:20

 UK 12-inch vinyl (659297 6)
 "Blow Your Mind" (Album Version) – 8:35
 "Hooked Up" (Instrumental) – 4:36

 UK cassette single (659297 4)
 "Blow Your Mind" (Part 1) – 3:51
 "Hooked Up" – 4:36

 Japanese CD single (ESCA 5782)
 "Blow Your Mind" (Radio Edit) – 3:51
 "Blow Your Mind" (Parts 1 and 2) – 8:35
 "When You Gonna Learn" (JK Mix) – 6:20

Charts

References

1992 songs
1993 singles
Black-and-white music videos
Jamiroquai songs
Music videos directed by Vaughan Arnell
S2 Records singles
Songs written by Jason Kay
Songs written by Toby Smith